The following places in California are named Baywood Park:
Baywood Park, San Luis Obispo County, California
Baywood Park, San Mateo County, California